The Justice Trilogy, also called the Justice Cycle, was a series of young-adult science-fiction books written by Virginia Hamilton. Considered philosophically significant by critics within the field of young adult literature, the series is also notable as one of the first young-adult science fiction novels by a significant African American author.

The series consists of three books:

 Justice and Her Brothers (1978).  A young African-American girl finds her idyllic rural summer disturbed by the discovery that both she and her somewhat sinister twin brothers have powerful psychic powers.
 Dustland (1980).  The siblings from the first volume, together with a friend, time travel into a strange post-apocalyptic future.
 The Gathering (1981). Justice and her brothers must overcome their sibling rivalries in order to defeat a malevolent entity from the future.

References

American children's novels
Children's science fiction novels
African-American literature
Literature by African-American women